Elizabeth Gardner may refer to:

Elizabeth Gardner (athlete) (born 1980), Australian freestyle skier
Elizabeth Gardner (physicist) (1957–1988), British theoretical physicist
Elizabeth Jane Gardner (1837–1922), American painter
Elizabeth L. Gardner (1921–2011), American pilot

See also
Elizabeth Gardiner (born 1966), British solicitor
Elizabeth Garner (1892–1973), Scottish author and politician